François Lapointe may refer to:

François Lapointe (racewalker) (born 1961), Canadian retired racewalker
François Lapointe (politician) (born 1962), Canadian politician